The classification system of inhabited localities in Russia and some other post-Soviet states has certain peculiarities compared with those in other countries.

Classes

During the Soviet time, each of the republics of the Soviet Union, including the Russian SFSR, had its own legislative documents dealing with classification of inhabited localities.  After the dissolution of the Soviet Union, the task of developing and maintaining such classification in Russia was delegated to the federal subjects.  While currently there are certain peculiarities to classifications used in many federal subjects, they are all still largely based on the system used in the RSFSR.  In all federal subjects, the inhabited localities are classified into two major categories: urban and rural. Further divisions of these categories vary slightly from one federal subject to another, but they all follow common trends described below.

Urban

Cities and towns (gorod; pl. , goroda).  Cities and towns are classified by their level of jurisdiction (district/federal subject/federal). The Russian language has no separate words for "town" and "city" ("" is used for both). Some translators prefer the word "city" for urban populated places with population of at least 100,000 persons.
Urban-type settlements (posyolok gorodskogo tipa; pl. ) is a type of smaller urban locality.  This type of urban locality was first introduced in the Soviet Union in 1924, with the following subcategories:
Urban-type settlement proper—mostly urban population of 3,000–12,000.
 Work settlement (rabochy posyolok)—mostly urban population occupied in industrial manufacture.
Suburban (dacha) settlement (dachny posyolok)—typically, a suburban settlement with summer dachas.
Resort settlement (kurortny posyolok)—mostly urban population occupied in services to holidaymakers (on the seaside or a mineral water spa, or in the mountains for walks and alpine skiing).
 Shift settlements for shift method work.

In 1957, the procedures for categorizing urban-type settlements were further refined.<ref> (Decree of the Presidium of the Supreme Soviet of the RSFSR of September 12, 1957 On Procedures of Categorizing the Inhabited Localities as Cities, Work and Resort Settlements)</ref>

Rural
Multiple types of rural localities exist, some common through the whole territory of Russia, some specific to certain federal subjects. The most common types include:
Derevnyas (derevnya; pl. , derevni), hamlets
Selos (selo; pl. , syola), villages (historically, ones with an Orthodox church).
Stanitsas (stanitsa; pl. , stanitsy), villages (historically, Cossack rural settlements)
Slobodas (sloboda; pl. , slobody), villages (historically, settlements freed from taxes and levies)
(Rural-type) settlements (posyolok (selskogo tipa); pl. ).  The "rural-type" designation is added to the settlements the population of which is mostly occupied in agriculture, while posyolok proper indicates a mix of population working in agriculture and industry.

Historical
Krepost (a fort), a fortified settlement
A Kremlin (fortification) (citadel), a major krepost, usually including a castle and surrounded by a posad
An ostrog, a more primitive kind of krepost which could be put up quickly within rough walls of debarked pointed timber
Posad, a medieval suburban settlement
Mestechko (from ),  a small town in the Western Krai annexed during the partitions of Poland; typically a mestechko would have a Jewish majority and such towns are referred to in English by the Yiddish term shtetl
Pogost
Seltso, a type of rural locality in the Russian Empire and the Polish–Lithuanian Commonwealth
Pochinok (pochinok; pl. , pochinki'')—a newly formed rural locality of one or several families. Pochinoks were established as new settlements and usually grow into larger villages as they developed.

See also
City of federal subject significance
List of terms for country subdivisions
Lists of rural localities in Russia
Subdivisions of Russia
Town of district significance

References

External links
Doukhobor Genealogy Website. Jonathan J. Kalmakoff. Index of Russian Geographic Terms.

 
Types of populated places